"Only When I Sleep" is a song by Celtic folk rock band the Corrs, released in September 1997 as the first single from their second album, Talk on Corners (1997). The song focuses on being in love with someone in your dreams, not anyone in reality. The track was also included on The Corrs' album Dreams: The Ultimate Corrs Collection in 2006. The single managed to peak at number 10 on the Irish Singles Chart, number 34 on the Australian Singles Chart, and number 58 on the UK Singles Chart.

Critical reception
Alan Jones from Music Week described the song as "a classy and sonically pleasing ballad performed in a style midway between Roxette and Heart. The family's pleasing harmonies are a plus, as is the vaguely Irish fiddling. An invaluable trigger to sales of their upcoming album Talk On Corners."

Music video
The accompanying music video for "Only When I Sleep" was shot at the Alexandria Hotel in Los Angeles, and is of a more glamorous style than the previous videos. The hotel used to be very popular in the early days of Hollywood, and famous stars like Charlie Chaplin, Sarah Bernhardt, Rudolph Valentino, Douglas Fairbanks or Cecil B. DeMille but also politicians like Theodore Roosevelt and Winston Churchill stayed here. It is abandoned today but still used as a filming location of many films, TV shows (e.g. The X-Files) and other music videos.

Director Nigel Dick met Jim by chance at the airport of L.A. He has been directing music videos for many other artists, including R.E.M., Cher, Oasis, Tears for Fears and Alice Cooper.

Track listings
 UK CD single
 "Only When I Sleep" (radio edit) – 3:50
 "Only When I Sleep" (LP version) – 4:23
 "Remember" – 4:02
 "Only When I Sleep" (instrumental) – 4:23

 UK cassette single
 "Only When I Sleep" (radio edit) – 3:50
 "Remember" – 4:02

 French and Benelux CD single
 "Only When I Sleep" (radio edit) – 3:50
 "Only When I Sleep" (LP version) – 4:23
 "Only When I Sleep" (instrumental) – 4:23

Personnel
Credits are taken from the UK CD single liner notes.

The Corrs
 Andrea Corr – lead vocals, tin whistle
 Caroline Corr – vocals, drums, bodhrán
 Sharon Corr – vocals, violin
 Jim Corr – vocals, guitar, keyboards
 The Corrs – writing, co-production

Production
 John Shanks – writing
 Paul Peterson – writing
 Oliver Leiber – writing, production
 Bob Clearmountain – mixing
 John Hughes – management
 Brenda Rotheiser – art direction
 Blinkk – photography

Charts

Release history

Cover versions
In 1999, the song was covered by Tinkara Kovač and released on her second album Košček neba.

In 2004, the song was covered by Lee Eun-ju and used in her final film, The Scarlet Letter.

References

The Corrs songs
1990s ballads
1997 singles
1997 songs
143 Records singles
Atlantic Records singles
Lava Records singles
Music videos directed by Nigel Dick
Pop ballads
Songs written by John Shanks
Songs written by Oliver Leiber